The Scarborough Formation is a Pleistocene  geologic formation in Ontario.

See also

 List of fossiliferous stratigraphic units in Ontario

References
 

Geology of Ontario